Harpalus semenowi is a species of ground beetle in the subfamily Harpalinae. It was described by Tschiterscherine in 1901.

References

semenowi
Beetles described in 1901